The 2000 Speedway Grand Prix of Sweden was the second race of the 2000 Speedway Grand Prix season. It took place on 3 June in the Motorstadium in Linköping, Sweden It was the sixth Swedish SGP and was won by Australian Jason Crump.

Starting positions draw 

The Speedway Grand Prix Commission nominated Nicki Pedersen and Rune Holta as Wild Card.

Heat details

Standings

See also 
 Speedway Grand Prix
 List of Speedway Grand Prix riders

References

External links 
 FIM-live.com
 SpeedwayWorld.tv

S
Speedway Grand Prix
2000